Szklana Huta  is a former settlement in the administrative district of Gmina Boronów, within Lubliniec County, Silesian Voivodeship, in southern Poland.

References

Villages in Lubliniec County